Casa Creed (foaled March 21, 2016) is an American multiple Grade I turf winning Thoroughbred racehorse. His Grade I wins include the Jaipur Stakes both in 2021 and 2022 at Belmont Park and in 2022 the Fourstardave Handicap at Saratoga Race Course.

Background

Casa Creed is a bay horse who was bred in Kentucky by Silver Springs Stud, a daughter of 2012 Malibu Stakes winner Jimmy Creed out of the Bellamy Road unraced mare Achalaya. Casa Creed is the first of her six foals. Achalaya also has a two-year-old Distorted Humor colt, a yearling Omaha Beach colt, and a 2022 Authentic filly. In 2022 his sire Jimmy Creed stands at Spendthrift Farm for US$10,000.

Casa Creed was first bought at the Ocala Breeder's Sales Company 2017 Winter mixed Sale for US$15,000 from the Janie Roper consignment by Amalio Ruiz-Lozano. Later that year Casa Creed was bought for US$105,000 from the Kelli Mitchell consignment at the Keeneland September Yearling Sale by LRE Racing.

After two starts in 2018 LRE Racing sold a share to Mike Francesa, New York sports talk radio presenter's JEH Racing Stable.

Casa Creed is trained by U.S. Racing Hall of Fame trainer William I. Mott.

Statistics

Legend:

 
 

Notes:

An (*) asterisk after the odds means Casa Creed was the post-time favorite.

Pedigree

References

2016 racehorse births
Racehorses bred in Kentucky
Racehorses trained in the United States
Thoroughbred family 5-i
American Grade 1 Stakes winners